Photoionisation cross section in the context of condensed matter physics refers to the probability of a particle (usually an electron) being emitted from its electronic state.

Cross section in photoemission 

The photoemission is a useful experimental method for the determination and the study of the electronic states. Sometimes the small amount of deposited material over a surface has a weak contribution to the photoemission spectra, which makes its identification very difficult. 
The knowledge of the cross section of a material can help to detect thin layers or 1D nanowires over a substrate. A right choice of the photon energy can enhance a small amount of material deposited over a surface, otherwise the display of the different spectra won't be possible.

See also
Gamma ray cross section
ARPES
Synchrotron radiation
Cross section (physics)
Absorption cross section
Nuclear cross section

References

External links 
Elettra's photoemission cross sections calculations

Electromagnetism
Condensed matter physics